Mohamed Khalifa (born November 16, 1986) is an Egyptian professional footballer who plays as a centre forward for the Egyptian club El Qanah FC.

Career
In 2016, Khalifa signed a 1-year contract for Aswan in a free agent transfer from Ghazl El Mahalla, he left by the end of his contract to El-Entag El-Harby and signed a 3-year contract for them.

On 30 January 2019 it was announced, that Khalifa had joined Tanta SC.

References

External links
Mohamed Khalifa at KOOORA.com
Mohamed Khalifa at Footballdatabase

Living people
1986 births
Egyptian footballers
Egyptian Premier League players
Association football forwards
Al Masry SC players
El Dakhleya SC players
Ghazl El Mahalla SC players
Aswan SC players
El Entag El Harby SC players
Tanta SC players
El Qanah FC players